Lise Vinet (born 31 March 1994) is a French female canoeist who won a medal at senior level at the Wildwater Canoeing World Championships.

Medals at the World Championships
Senior

References

External links
 

1994 births
Living people
French female canoeists
Place of birth missing (living people)